A Clearing in the Distance: Frederick Law Olmsted and North America in the Nineteenth Century  is a biography of 19th-century landscape architect Frederick Law Olmsted, published in 1999, by Canadian architect, professor and writer Witold Rybczynski.

It was short-listed for the Charles Taylor Prize in 2000.

References

External links
Presentation by Rybczynski on A Clearing in the Distance, 12 May 1999
Booknotes interview with Rybczynski on A Clearing in the Distance, 17 October 1999.

1999 non-fiction books
Books by Witold Rybczynski
Architecture books